The feudal barony of Okehampton was a very large feudal barony, the largest mediaeval fiefdom in the county of Devon, England, whose caput was Okehampton Castle and manor. It was one of eight feudal baronies in Devonshire which existed during the mediaeval era.

Descent

The first holder of the feudal barony of Okehampton was Baldwin FitzGilbert  (dead by Jan 1091) called in the Latin Domesday Book of 1086 Baldvinus Vicecomes, "Baldwin the Viscount" (of Devon), an office which equated to the earlier Saxon office of Sheriff of Devon. As younger son of Gilbert, Count of Brionne, he was cousin of William the Conqueror. His fiefdom listed in Domesday Book comprised 176 land-holdings, mostly manors, but 2 of which, listed first, comprised groups of houses in Barnstaple and Exeter. The third holding listed for his fiefdom is Okehampton: Ipse Balduin ten(et) de rege Ochementone, ibi sedet castellum ("Baldwin himself (i.e. in demesne) holds Okehampton from the king, there sits his castle"). The nature of the feudal land tenure for feudal barons was per baroniam, that is to say they were bound to serve the king as one of his barons, which involved onerous duties not only of attending parliaments to advise the king but also of providing knights and soldiers for military service to the royal army for specified periods each year. The baron himself was frequently present in battle.

Norman
The descent of Okehampton in the family of Baldwin fitzGilbert was as follows:

Baldwin FitzGilbert (dead by Jan 1091), Sheriff of Devon. All three of his sons died successively without children.
William FitzBaldwin (died 1096), son of Baldwin, died without children
Robert FitzBaldwin (died 1101), brother of William, died without children
Richard FitzBaldwin (died 1137), brother of Robert, Sheriff of Devon in 1096 and/or 1116, died without children. He founded Brightley Priory

The ownership of Okehampton then becomes obscure for two decades, before it was held by a descendant of Baldwin fitzGilbert.

Maud d'Avranches (died 1173), daughter and sole-heiress of Robert d'Avranches, who was son of William fitzWimund by a daughter of Baldwin fitzGilbert.  She married firstly William de Curci (died pre 1162), by him having a daughter Hawise.  As a widow, she would remarry to Robert FitzRoy (died 1172), a natural son of King Henry I of England.  By her second husband Maud had a further daughter, Maud du Sap (died 1224).  Maud du Sap, following her father's death, became a royal ward, and King Henry II married her to Reginald I de Courtenay (died 1190).
Hawise de Curci (died 1219), daughter Maud by William de Curci, married the step-son of her half-sister, Reginald de Courtenay.  Through this marriage, the barony came into the possession of the Courtenay family.

Courtenay

Robert de Courtenay (died 1242), son of Reginald de Courtenay (died 1194) by his wife Hawise de Curci (died 1219), heiress of Okehampton. He married Mary de Vernon, daughter of William de Redvers, 5th Earl of Devon (died 1217), feudal baron of Plympton, Devon. From this marriage the Courtenays later inherited the barony of Plympton in 1293 and in 1335 were declared Earls of Devon.
John de Courtenay (died 1274), (son) who married Isabel de Vere, daughter of Hugh de Vere, 4th Earl of Oxford (c. 1210 – 1263)
Sir Hugh de Courtenay (died 1292), (son) who married  Eleanor le Despenser (died 1328), daughter of Hugh le Despenser, 1st Earl of Winchester (1261–1326).
Hugh Courtenay, 9th Earl of Devon (1276–1340), (son). In 1293 on the death of his cousin Isabella de Forz, Countess of Devon (1237–1293) (eldest daughter of Baldwin de Redvers, 6th Earl of Devon (1217–1245), feudal baron of Plympton in Devon) he became heir to the feudal barony of Plympton, and in 1335 was declared Earl of Devon. The descent of the feudal barony of Okehampton thenceforth follows the descent of the earldom of Devon. In 1539 King Henry VIII seized the lands of the barony and had Henry Courtenay, 1st Marquess of Exeter(died 1539) executed for treason. The Earldom of Devon became forfeit, and the Courtenay lands  in Cornwall escheated (i.e. reverted) to the crown to be held  by the Duchy of Cornwall.

List of constituent manors

The barony comprised originally the following manors held in-chief per baroniam by Baldwin the Sheriff, in order of Domesday Book listing:

References

Sources

Further reading
Some Account of the Barony and Town of Okehampton: Its antiquities and institutions. Bridges, W. B; Wright, W. H. K.; Rattenbury, J.; Shebbeare, R,; Thomas, C.; Fothergill, H. G. Tiverton: W. Masland, 1889

Feudal baronies in Devon